The Heart Sūtra (  or) is a popular sutra in Mahāyāna Buddhism. In Sanskrit, the title  translates as "The Heart of the Perfection of Wisdom".

The Sutra famously states, "Form is emptiness (śūnyatā), emptiness is form." It is a condensed exposé on the Buddhist Mahayana teaching of the Two Truths doctrine, which says that ultimately all phenomena are Śūnyatā (emptiness).

It has been called "the most frequently used and recited text in the entire Mahayana Buddhist tradition." The text has been translated into English dozens of times from Chinese, Sanskrit, and Tibetan, as well as other source languages.

Summary of the sutra
In the sutra, Avalokiteśvara addresses Śariputra, explaining the fundamental emptiness (śūnyatā) of all phenomena, known through and as the five aggregates of human existence (skandhas): form (rūpa), feeling (vedanā), volitions (saṅkhāra), perceptions (saṃjñā), and consciousness (vijñāna). Avalokiteśvara famously states, "Form is Emptiness (śūnyatā). Emptiness is Form", and declares the other skandhas to be equally empty—that is, dependently originated.

Avalokiteśvara then goes through some of the most fundamental Buddhist teachings, such as the Four Noble Truths, and explains that in emptiness, none of these notions apply. This is interpreted according to the two truths doctrine as saying that teachings, while accurate descriptions of conventional truth, are mere statements about reality—they are not reality itself—and that they are therefore not applicable to the ultimate truth that is by definition beyond mental understanding. Thus the bodhisattva, as the archetypal Mahayana Buddhist, relies on the perfection of wisdom, defined in the Mahāprajñāpāramitā Sūtra to be the wisdom that perceives reality directly without conceptual attachment, thereby achieving nirvana.

The sutra concludes with the mantra , meaning "gone, gone, everyone gone to the other shore, awakening, svaha."

Popularity and stature

The Heart Sutra is "the single most commonly recited, copied, and studied scripture in East Asian Buddhism."  It is recited by adherents of Mahayana schools of Buddhism regardless of sectarian affiliation.

While the origin of the sutra is disputed by some modern scholars, it was widely known throughout South Asia (including Afghanistan) from at least the Pala Empire period (c. 750–1200 CE) and in parts of India until at least the middle of the 14th century. The stature of the Heart Sutra throughout early medieval India can be seen from its title 'Holy Mother of all Buddhas Heart of the Perfection of Wisdom' dating from at least the 8th century CE (see Philological explanation of the text).

The long version of the Heart Sutra is extensively studied by the various Tibetan Buddhist schools, where the Heart Sutra is chanted, but also treated as a tantric text, with a tantric ceremony associated with it.  It is also viewed as one of the daughter sutras of the Prajnaparamita genre in the Vajrayana tradition as passed down from Tibet.

The text has been translated into many languages, and dozens of English translations and commentaries have been published, along with an unknown number of informal versions on the internet.

Versions
There are two main versions of the Heart Sutra: a short version and a long version.

The short version as translated by Xuanzang is the most popular version of adherents practicing East Asian schools of Buddhism. Xuanzang's canonical text (T. 251) has a total of 260 Chinese characters.  Some Japanese and Korean versions have an additional 2 characters. The short version has also been translated into Tibetan but it is not part of the current Tibetan Buddhist Canon.

The long version differs from the short version by including both an introductory and concluding section, features that most Buddhist sutras have.  The introduction introduces the sutra to the listener with the traditional Buddhist opening phrase "Thus have I heard".  It then describes the venue in which the Buddha (or sometimes bodhisattvas, etc.) promulgate the teaching and the audience to whom the teaching is given.  The concluding section ends the sutra with thanks and praises to the Buddha.

Both versions are chanted on a daily basis by adherents of practically all schools of East Asian Buddhism and by some adherents of Tibetan and Newar Buddhism.

Dating and origins

Earliest extant versions and references to the Heart Sutra
The earliest extant dated text of the Heart Sutra is a stone stele dated to 661 CE located at Yunju Temple and is part of the Fangshan Stone Sutra. It is also the earliest copy of Xuanzang's 649 CE translation of the Heart Sutra (Taisho 221); made three years before Xuanzang passed away.

A palm-leaf manuscript found at the Hōryū-ji Temple is the earliest undated extant Sanskrit manuscript of the Heart Sutra. It is dated to c. 7th–8th century CE by the Tokyo National Museum where it is currently kept.

Source of the Heart Sutra - Nattier controversy

Jan Nattier (1992) argues, based on her cross-philological study of Chinese and Sanskrit texts of the Heart Sutra, that the Heart Sutra was initially composed in China.

Fukui Fumimasa, Harada Waso, Ishii Kōsei and Siu Sai yau based on their cross-philological study of Chinese and Sanskrit texts of the Heart Sutra and other medieval period Sanskrit Mahayana sutras theorize that the Heart Sutra could not have been composed in China but was composed in India.

Kuiji and Woncheuk were the two main disciples of Xuanzang. Their 7th century commentaries are the earliest extant commentaries on the Heart Sutra; both commentaries, according to Hyun Choo, Harada Waso, Ishii Kosei, Dan Lusthaus, etc., contradict Nattier's Chinese origin theory.

Philological explanation of the text

Title

Historical titles

The titles of the earliest extant manuscripts of the Heart Sutra all includes the words "hṛdaya"  or "heart" and "prajñāpāramitā" or "perfection of wisdom".  Beginning from the 8th century and continuing at least until the 13th century, the titles of the Indic manuscripts of the Heart Sutra contained the words "bhagavatī" or "mother of all buddhas" and "prajñāpāramitā".

Later Indic manuscripts have more varied titles.

Titles in use today
In the western world, this sutra is known as the Heart Sutra (a translation derived from its most common name in East Asian countries). But it is also sometimes called the Heart of Wisdom Sutra.  In Tibet, Mongolia and other regions influenced by Vajrayana, it is known as The [Holy] Mother of all Buddhas Heart (Essence) of the Perfection of Wisdom.

In the Tibetan text the title is given first in Sanskrit and then in Tibetan: ,  English translation of Tibetan title: Mother of All Buddhas Heart (Essence) of the Perfection of Wisdom.

In other languages, the commonly used title is an abbreviation of Prajñāpāramitāhṛdayasūtraṃ : i.e. The Prajñāhṛdaya Sūtra) (The Heart of Wisdom Sutra). They are as follows: e.g. Korean: Banya Shimgyeong; Japanese: ; Vietnamese: .

Content

Various commentators divide this text into different numbers of sections. In the long version, there exists the traditional opening "Thus have I heard" and Buddha along with a community of bodhisattvas and monks gathered with Avalokiteśvara and Sariputra at Gridhakuta (a mountain peak located at Rajgir, the traditional site where the majority of the Perfection of Wisdom teachings were given), when through the power of Buddha, Sariputra asks Avalokiteśvara  for advice on the practice of the Perfection of Wisdom. The sutra then describes the experience of liberation of the bodhisattva of compassion, Avalokiteśvara, as a result of vipassanā gained while engaged in deep meditation to awaken the faculty of prajña (wisdom). The insight refers to apprehension of the fundamental emptiness (śūnyatā) of all phenomena, known through and as the five aggregates of human existence (skandhas): form (rūpa), feeling (vedanā), volitions (saṅkhāra), perceptions (saṃjñā), and consciousness (vijñāna).

The specific sequence of concepts listed in lines 12–20 ("...in emptiness there is no form, no sensation, ... no attainment and no non-attainment")  is the same sequence used in the Sarvastivadin Samyukta Agama; this sequence differs in comparable texts of other sects. On this basis, Red Pine has argued that the Heart Sūtra is specifically a response to Sarvastivada teachings that, in the sense "phenomena" or its constituents, are real. Lines 12–13 enumerate the five skandhas. Lines 14–15 list the twelve ayatanas or abodes. Line 16 makes a reference to the 18 dhatus or elements of consciousness, using a conventional shorthand of naming only the first (eye) and last (conceptual consciousness) of the elements. Lines 17–18 assert the emptiness of the Twelve Nidānas, the traditional twelve links of dependent origination, using the same shorthand as with the eighteen dhatus. Line 19 refers to the Four Noble Truths.

Avalokiteśvara addresses Śariputra, who was the promulgator of abhidharma according to the scriptures and texts of the Sarvastivada and other early Buddhist schools, having been singled out by the Buddha to receive those teachings.  Avalokiteśvara famously states, "Form is empty (śūnyatā). Emptiness is form", and declares the other skandhas to be equally empty of the most fundamental Buddhist teachings such as the Four Noble Truths and explains that in emptiness none of these notions apply. This is interpreted according to the two truths doctrine as saying that teachings, while accurate descriptions of conventional truth, are mere statements about reality—they are not reality itself—and that they are therefore not applicable to the ultimate truth that is by definition beyond mental understanding. Thus the bodhisattva, as the archetypal Mahayana Buddhist, relies on the perfection of wisdom, defined in the Mahaprajnaparamita Sutra to be the wisdom that perceives reality directly without conceptual attachment thereby achieving nirvana.

All Buddhas of the three ages (past, present and future) rely on the Perfection of Wisdom to reach unexcelled complete Enlightenment.  The Perfection of Wisdom is the all powerful Mantra, the great enlightening mantra, the unexcelled mantra, the unequalled mantra, able to dispel all suffering.  This is true and not false. The Perfection of Wisdom is then condensed in the mantra with which the sutra concludes: "Gate Gate Pāragate Pārasamgate Bodhi Svāhā" (literally "Gone gone, gone beyond, gone utterly beyond, Enlightenment hail!"). In the long version, Buddha praises Avalokiteśvara for giving the exposition of the Perfection of Wisdom and all gathered rejoice in its teaching.  Many schools traditionally have also praised the sutra by uttering three times the equivalent of "Mahāprajñāpāramitā" after the end of the recitation of the short version.

Mantra

Buddhist exegetical works

China, Japan, Korea and Vietnam

Two commentaries of the Heart Sutra were composed by pupils of Xuanzang, Woncheuk and Kuiji, in the 7th century. These appear to be the earliest extant commentaries on the text. Both have been translated into English. Both Kuījī and Woncheuk's commentaries approach the Heart Sutra from both a Yogācāra and Madhyamaka viewpoint; however,  Kuījī's commentary presents detailed line by line Madhyamaka viewpoints as well and is therefore the earliest surviving Madhyamaka commentary on the Heart Sutra. Of special note, although Woncheuk did his work in China, he was born in Silla, one of the kingdoms located at the time in Korea.

The chief Tang Dynasty commentaries have all now been translated into English.

Notable Japanese commentaries include those by Kūkai (9th Century, Japan), who treats the text as a tantra, and Hakuin, who gives a Zen commentary.

There is also a Vietnamese commentarial tradition for the Heart Sutra.  The earliest recorded commentary is the early 14th century Thiền commentary entitled 'Commentary on the Prajñāhṛdaya Sutra' by Pháp Loa.

All of the East Asian commentaries are commentaries of Xuanzang's translation of the short version of the Heart Sutra. Kukai's commentary is purportedly of Kumārajīva's translation of the short version of the Heart Sutra;but upon closer examination seems to quote only from Xuanzang's translation.

India
Eight Indian commentaries survive in Tibetan translation and have been the subject of two books by Donald Lopez. These typically treat the text either from a Madhyamaka point of view, or as a tantra (esp. Śrīsiṃha). Śrī Mahājana's commentary has a definite "Yogachara bent". All of these commentaries are on the long version of the Heart Sutra.  The Eight Indian Commentaries from the Kangyur are (cf first eight on chart):

There is one surviving Chinese translation of an Indian commentary in the Chinese Buddhist Canon. Āryadeva's commentary is on the short version of the Heart Sutra.

Other
Besides the Tibetan translation of Indian commentaries on the Heart Sutra, Tibetan monk-scholars also made their own commentaries.  One example is Tāranātha's A Textual Commentary on the Heart Sutra.

In modern times, the text has become increasingly popular amongst exegetes as a growing number of translations and commentaries attest. The Heart Sutra was already popular in Chan and Zen Buddhism, but has become a staple for Tibetan Lamas as well.

Selected English translations
The first English translation was presented to the Royal Asiatic Society in 1863 by Samuel Beal, and published in their journal in 1865. Beal used a Chinese text corresponding to T251 and a 9th Century Chan commentary by Dàdiān Bǎotōng [c. 815 CE]. In 1881, Max Müller published a Sanskrit text based on the Hōryū-ji manuscript along an English translation.

There are more than 40 published English translations of the Heart Sutra from Sanskrit, Chinese, and Tibetan, beginning with Beal (1865). Almost every year new translations and commentaries are published. The following is a representative sample.

Recordings 

The Heart Sūtra has been set to music a number of times. Many singers solo this sutra.

 The Buddhist Audio Visual Production Centre produced a Cantonese album of recordings of the Heart Sūtra in 1995 featuring a number of Hong Kong pop singers, including Alan Tam, Anita Mui and Faye Wong and composer by Andrew Lam Man Chung to raise money to rebuild the Chi Lin Nunnery. 
 Malaysian Imee Ooi sings the short version of the Heart Sūtra in Sanskrit accompanied by music entitled 'The Shore Beyond, Prajna Paramita Hrdaya Sutram', released in 2009.
 Composer and recording artist Robert Gass, with his group On Wings of Song, released Heart of Perfect Wisdom in 1990, with two long pieces prominently featuring the "Gate Gate" mantra. This is now available as Heart of Perfect Wisdom / A Sufi Song of Love.
 Hong Kong pop singers, such as the Four Heavenly Kings sang the Heart Sūtra to raise money for relief efforts related to the 1999 Jiji earthquake. 
 A Mandarin version was first performed by Faye Wong in May 2009 at the Famen Temple for the opening of the Namaste Dagoba, a stupa housing the finger relic of Buddha rediscovered at the Famen Temple. She has sung this version numerous times since and its recording was subsequently used as a theme song in the blockbusters Aftershock (2010) and Xuanzang (2016). 
 Shaolin Monk Shifu Shi Yan Ming recites the Sutra at the end of the song "Life Changes" by the Wu-Tang Clan, in remembrance of the deceased member ODB.
 The outro of the b-side song "Ghetto Defendant" by the British first wave punk band The Clash also features the Heart Sūtra, recited by American beat poet Allen Ginsberg. 
 A slightly edited version is used as the lyrics for Yoshimitsu's theme in the PlayStation 2 game Tekken Tag Tournament. An Indian styled version was also created by Bombay Jayashri, titled Ji Project. It was also recorded and arranged by Malaysian singer/composer Imee Ooi. 
 An Esperanto translation of portions of the text furnished the libretto of the cantata La Koro Sutro by American composer Lou Harrison.
 The Heart Sūtra appears as a track on an album of sutras "performed" by VOCALOID voice software, using the Nekomura Iroha voice pack. The album, Syncretism of Shinto and Buddhism by VOCALOID, is by the artist tamachang.
 Toward the end of the opera The (R)evolution of Steve Jobs by Mason Bates the character inspired by Kōbun Chino Otogawa sings part of the Heart Sūtra to introduce the scene in which Steve Jobs weds Laurene Powell at Yosemite in 1991.
 Part of the Sutra can be heard on Shiina Ringo's song 鶏と蛇と豚 (Gate of Living), from her studio album Sandokushi (2019)

Popular culture
In the centuries following the historical Xuanzang, an extended tradition of literature fictionalizing the life of Xuanzang and glorifying his special relationship with the Heart Sūtra arose, of particular note being the Journey to the West (16th century/Ming dynasty). In chapter nineteen of Journey to the West, the fictitious Xuanzang learns by heart the Heart Sūtra after hearing it recited one time by the Crow's Nest Zen Master, who flies down from his tree perch with a scroll containing it, and offers to impart it. A full text of the Heart Sūtra is quoted in this fictional account.

In the 2003 Korean film Spring, Summer, Fall, Winter...and Spring, the apprentice is ordered by his Master to carve the Chinese characters of the sutra into the wooden monastery deck to quiet his heart.

The Sanskrit mantra of the Heart Sūtra was used as the lyrics for the opening theme song of the 2011 Chinese television series Journey to the West.

The 2013 Buddhist film Avalokitesvara, tells the origins of Mount Putuo, the famous pilgrimage site for Avalokitesvara Bodhisattva in China. The film was filmed onsite on Mount Putuo and featured several segments where monks chant the Heart Sutra in Chinese and Sanskrit. Egaku, the protagonist of the film, also chants the Heart Sutra in Japanese.

In the 2015 Japanese film I Am a Monk, Koen, a twenty-four year old bookstore clerk becomes a Shingon monk at the Eifuku-ji after the death of his grandfather.  The Eifuku-ji is the fifty-seventh temple in the eighty-eight temple Shikoku Pilgrimage Circuit. He is at first unsure of himself. However, during his first service as he chants the Heart Sutra, he comes to an important realization.

Bear McCreary recorded four Japanese-American monks chanting in Japanese, the entire Heart Sutra in his sound studio. He picked a few discontinuous segments and digitally enhanced them for their hypnotic sound effect.  The result became the main theme of King Ghidorah in the 2019 film Godzilla: King of the Monsters.

Influence on western philosophy
Schopenhauer, in the final words of his main work, compared his doctrine to the Śūnyatā of the Heart Sūtra. In Volume 1, § 71 of The World as Will and Representation, Schopenhauer wrote: "...to those in whom the will [to continue living] has turned and has denied itself, this very real world of ours, with all its suns and Milky Ways, is — nothing." To this, he appended the following note: "This is also the Prajna–Paramita of the Buddhists, the 'beyond all knowledge,' in other words, the point where subject and object no longer exist."

See also

 Mahāyāna sutras
 Prajñāpāramitā

Notes

References

Sources

 Beal, Samuel. (1865) The Paramita-hridaya Sutra. Or. The Great Paramita Heart Sutra. Journal of the Royal Asiatic Society of Great Britain and Ireland, No.2 Dec 1865, 25-28 
 
 
 
 

 
 
 
 
  (originally published 1960 by Mouton & Co.)
 

 

 

 
 
 

 
 
 

 

 
 Kelsang Gyatso, Geshe (2001). Heart of Wisdom: An Explanation of the Heart Sutra, Tharpa Publications, (4th. ed.). 

  
 
 
 
  (cf pp 211–224 for tr. of Hanshan Deqing's Straight Talk on the Heart Sutra (Straightforward Explanation of the Heart Sutra))
 Lusthaus, Dan (2003). The Heart Sūtra in Chinese Yogācāra: Some Comparative Comments on the Heart Sūtra Commentaries of Wŏnch'ŭk and K'uei-chi. International Journal of Buddhist Thought & Culture 3, 59–103.

 
 Minoru Kiyota (1978). Mahayana Buddhist Meditation: Theory and Practice Hawaii: University of Hawaii Press. (esp. Cook, Francis H. 'Fa-tsang's Brief Commentary on the Prajñāpāramitā-hṛdaya-sūtra.' pp. 167–206.) 
 Müller, Max (1881). 'The Ancient Palm Leaves containing the Prajñāpāramitā-Hṛidaya Sūtra and Uṣniṣa-vijaya-Dhāraṇi.' in Buddhist Texts from Japan (Vol 1.iii). Oxford Univers* ity Press. Online

 
 

 
 

 

 Shih, Heng-Ching  & Lusthaus, Dan (2006). A Comprehensive Commentary on the Heart Sutra (Prajnaparamita-hyrdaya-sutra). Numata Center for Buddhist Translation & Research.  
 

 
 

 

 
 Yu, Anthony C. (1980). The Journey to the West. Chicago and London: The University of Chicago Press. . First published 1977.

Further reading
 
 
 
 
 
 
 
 Rinchen, Sonam. (2003) Heart Sutra: An Oral Commentary Snow Lion Publications

External links

Documentary
 Journey of the Heart Produced by Ravi Verma

Translations
  Sanskrit, Chinese, Tibetan, and English versions of The Heart Sutra in sentence-by-sentence reading format; facilitating easy comparison.
  A guide to some of the important translations and commentaries.
  From the Chinese version attributed to Xuanzang (T251).
  From the Chinese version attributed to Kumārajīva (T250).
  From the Chinese translation by Prajñā (T253).
  Conze's translation from his Sanskrit edition (1948, rev. 1967).
  From the Tibetan text.
 The Heart Sutra in English - Translated by Gerhard Herzog. Translation from Chinese, Kaoshiung, Taiwan, 1971.
 

Mahayana sutras
Vaipulya sutras
Avalokiteśvara
Guanyin